Tennessee Ramblers may refer to:

Tennessee Ramblers (Tennessee band), an old-time string band led by the Sievers family that recorded for Brunswick/Vocalion in 1928 and 1929
Tennessee Ramblers (North Carolina band), a country music group formed by Dick Hartman that recorded for the Bluebird label in 1935